Baycar (also styled as baycar) is a bus service in Cardiff, serving the city centre and Cardiff Bay.

The service forms part of the wider Cardiff Bus network, but is unique in that the entire Baycar bus system includes its own branded vehicles, bus shelters and boards.

History
The service was introduced in 2006 to connect the city centre to the old Cardiff docklands redeveloped to create Cardiff Bay, a primarily entertainment and retail area.

In 2007, the service was used by 39,000 each week.

Under the 5-year contract, the bus service was subsidised £200,000 per month by Cardiff Council, which owns Cardiff Bus, and by the Welsh Government.

The Baycar system came second to consumer watchdog Bus Users UK Cymru Wales, under the Best Example of Participation in Transport category, at the Chartered Institute of Logistics and Transport Wales' National Transport Awards in 2007.

Service pattern
Services run from around 06:00 until 23:30 Monday to Saturdays (from 08:00 on Sundays and Bank Holidays). Buses run every 10 minutes Monday–Friday daytimes, every 15 minutes Sat-Sun daytimes and every 20 minutes Monday–Friday late evenings.

The core service operates runs from the Wales Millennium Centre to the northern city centre. The route is extended during peak times (Monday–Friday 0645–1930 (to Civic Centre) / 0645–2010 (to Porth Teigr)) so that the north of the route runs through Cathays Park (the Civic Centre) and the south of the route extends to Porth Teigr.

Fares on the service are, a with all Cardiff Bus services, £2.00 for a single, or £4.00 for a return/day-to-go ticket (as of December 2019).

Vehicles
The vehicle, presently ADL Enviro 200, have its own distinct blue livery. It is equipped with seats with leather headrests, air-conditioning, reserved spaces for buggies and wheelchairs, CCTV, free WiFi, on-bus screens with local travel information, hearing induction loop and next stop information.

Route

The route leaves Cardiff Bay and then circles the city centre anti-clockwise, returning south to towards Cardiff Bay. On Friday and Saturday nights and during events at the Millennium Stadium, only the eastern and northern parts of the city centre are served due to road closures to vehicles. In this case, the baycar service terminates in the city centre at Greyfriars, not continuing down Kingsway and St. Mary Street.

Amongst the landmarks and attractions served are:
Cardiff Bay
Roath Lock
Norwegian Church Arts Centre
Wales Millennium Centre
Mermaid Quay
Red Dragon Centre
Senedd
Pierhead Building
Cardiff Waterbus stops
Techniquest
Cardiff City Centre
St David's Centre
Cardiff Central Library
Cardiff International Arena
Capitol Centre
Civic centre
Cardiff University
Cardiff Castle
Millennium Stadium

See also
Capital City Red
Bus transport in Cardiff
Transport in Cardiff
Articulated buses in the United Kingdom

References

External links

Cardiff Bus: Baycar

Transport in Cardiff
Bus transport in Wales
Bus transport in Cardiff
Bus routes in Wales